Huillapima is a town and municipio in the Capayán Department of Catamarca Province, Argentina.

External links

Populated places in Catamarca Province